Spirax-Sarco Engineering plc is a British manufacturer of steam management systems and peristaltic pumps and associated fluid path technologies. It is headquartered in Cheltenham, England. It is listed on the London Stock Exchange and is a constituent of the FTSE 100 Index.

History

The Company was founded by Herman Sanders in 1888 and after a Mr Rehders joined the business, established as Sanders, Rehders & Co. ('Sarco') in London importing thermostatic steam traps from Germany. It started to manufacture steam traps in United Kingdom under the Spirax brand name in 1932 and was first listed on the London Stock Exchange in 1959. In 1960 a range of self-acting pressure controls are introduced for the first time: then in 1963 it bought Drayton Controls, a control valve and instrumentation business.

The company diversified into pump manufacturing in 1990 when it bought Watson-Marlow. It acquired the Jucker Industrial Division, an Italian controls business, in 1993, Bredel Hose Pumps, a business manufacturing high-pressure hose pumps, in 1996 and M&M International, an Italian piston actuated and solenoid valve business in 2001. In September 2005 it acquired Mitech Actuators & Controls and Proportional Control Technology, a pair of South African businesses making process controls. Then later that year it bought EMCO Flow Systems, a metering business.

The company acquired Intervalf, a Turkish operation, for £2.8m in 2009. It completed a new facility in Shanghai, China in June 2010: the plant, designed as Spirax's regional headquarters, combines a factory, warehouse, and offices.

In 2011 the Minister for UK Trade & Investment, Lord Green, opened the new Spirax Sarco facility in Saint Petersburg, Russia and in May 2012 the Deputy Prime Minister, Nick Clegg visited Spirax Sarco’s manufacturing facility in Cheltenham, Gloucestershire. In May 2012 there was a shareholder revolt after Spirax-Sarco paid a former Executive Director compensation of £783,660; the company compounded the problem by failing to inform the markets of the shareholder revolt as required by the Listing Rules. Then in November 2012 the company bought Termodinámica, a distributor based in Santiago de Chile and in February 2019 it bought Thermocoax, a US based business involved in the manufacture and supply of mineral insulated cable.

Operations
The company has three main operations:
 Steam Specialties: made up of Spirax-Sarco and Gestra, provides engineered solutions for the design, maintenance and provision of efficient industrial and commercial steam systems (from single products through to complete turnkey bespoke packages)
 Electric Thermal Solutions (ETS):  made up of Chromalox and Thermocoax, is a provider of advanced thermal technologies.
 Watson-Marlow Fluid Technology Solutions: peristaltic pumps and associated fluid path technologies for the food, pharmaceutical, chemical and environmental industries

Spirax-Sarco has operating units (operating companies, branches and associates) in 62 countries across the world.

References

External links
 Official site

Manufacturing companies established in 1888
Engineering companies of the United Kingdom
Companies based in Cheltenham
Companies listed on the London Stock Exchange
1888 establishments in England
1950s initial public offerings
British companies established in 1888
Manufacturing companies of the United Kingdom
Manufacturing companies based in London